Kovvur Assembly constituency is a constituency in East Godavari district of Andhra Pradesh, representing the state legislative assembly in India. It is one of the seven assembly segments of Rajahmundry Lok Sabha constituency, along with Anaparthy, Rajanagaram, Rajahmundry City, Rajahmundry Rural, Nidadavole, and Gopalapuram. Taneti Vanita is the present MLA of the constituency, who won the 2019 Andhra Pradesh Legislative Assembly election from Yuvajana Sramika Rythu Congress Party. , there are a total of 176,409 electors in the constituency.

History 
It is considered a stronghold of TDP, which won all the election battles here since its inception in 1983 except in 1999 when congress won with sufficient majority. Currently, Taneti Vanita (YSR Congress) is the present Kovvur constituency's MLA, who won 2019 Assembly elections against Vangalapudi Anitha (TDP) with a majority of 25,248 votes.

Mandals 

The three mandals that form the assembly constituency are:

Members of Legislative Assembly

Election results

Assembly elections 1952

Assembly Elections 2004

Assembly Elections 2009

Assembly elections 2014

Assembly elections 2019

See also 
 List of constituencies of the Andhra Pradesh Legislative Assembly

References 

Assembly constituencies of Andhra Pradesh